Geosophy is a concept introduced to geography by J.K. Wright in 1947. The word is a compound of ‘geo’ (Greek for earth) and ‘sophia’ (Greek for wisdom). Wright defined it thus:

Geosophy ... is the study of geographical knowledge from any or all points of view. It is to geography what historiography is to history; it deals with the nature and expression of geographical knowledge both past and present—with what Whittlesey has called ‘man’s sense of [terrestrial] space’. Thus it extends far beyond the core area of scientific geographical knowledge or of geographical knowledge as otherwise systematized by geographers. Taking into account the whole peripheral realm, it covers the geographical ideas, both true and false, of all manner of people—not only geographers, but farmers and fishermen, business executives and poets, novelists and painters, Bedouins and Hottentots—and for this reason it necessarily has to do in large degree with subjective conceptions.

(Wright 1947)

This has been summarised as:

the study of the world as people conceive of and imagine it

(McGreevy 1987)

Belief systems as they relate to human interaction with the Earth's environments.

 (attributed to Professor Innes Park 1995)

Superstition
Geosophy is sometimes used as a synonym for the study of earth mysteries.

References
Keighren, Innes M. “Geosophy, imagination, and terrae incognitae: exploring the intellectual history of John Kirtland Wright.” Journal of Historical Geography 31, no. 3 (2005): 546–62.
McGreevy, P. 1987 Imagining the future at Niagara Falls. Annals of the Association of American Geographers 77 (1):48–62
Wright, J.K. 1947.  Terrae Incognitae: The Place of Imagination in Geography Annals of the Association of American Geographers  37: 1–15.

Geography terminology